Onibe is a river in the east of Madagascar.

Its mouth is in the Indian Ocean at the city of Mahavelona (Foulpointe) in the region of Atsinanana.

References

Rivers of Atsinanana
Rivers of Madagascar